The Fort ships were a class of 198 cargo ships built in Canada during World War II for use by the United Kingdom under the Lend-Lease scheme. They all had names prefixed with "Fort" when built. The ships were in service between 1942 and 1985, with two still listed on shipping registers until 1992. A total of 53 were lost during the war due to accidents or enemy action. One of these, was destroyed in 1944 by the detonation of 1,400 tons of explosive on board her. This event, known as the Bombay Explosion, killed over 800 people and sank thirteen ships. Fort ships were ships transferred to the British Government and the Park ships were those employed by the Canadian Government, both had the similar design.

Description
The ships were of three types, the "North Sands" type, which were of riveted construction, and the "Canadian" and "Victory" types, which were of welded construction. They were built by eighteen different Canadian shipyards. Their triple expansion steam engines were built by seven different manufacturers.

History
The ships were built between 1941 and 1945 by ten different builders. The eight ships built by Burrard Dry Dock cost $1,856,500 each. During World War II, 28 were lost to enemy action, and four were lost due to accidents. Many of the surviving 166 ships passed to the United States Maritime Commission.

Crew
Park ships were armed. There were merchant seamen gunners. Also many British and Canadian merchantmen carried volunteer naval gunners called Defensively equipped merchant ship or DEMS gunners. The American ships carried Naval Armed Guard gunners.  Merchant seamen crewed the merchant ships of the British Merchant Navy which kept the United Kingdom supplied with raw materials, arms, ammunition, fuel, food and all of the necessities of a nation at war throughout World War II literally enabling the country to defend itself.  In doing this they sustained a considerably greater casualty rate than almost every branch of the armed services and suffered great hardship. Seamen were aged from fourteen through to their late seventies.
The lost are remembered in the Royal Canadian Naval Ships Memorial Monument in Spencer Smith Park in Burlington, Ontario.

Losses
Twenty-eight ships were lost due to enemy action and a further 25 due to accidents.

Enemy action
On 20 July 1943,  was bombed and sunk at Augusta, Sicily, Italy.
On 13 September 1943,  was bombed and sunk in the Atlantic Ocean by Luftwaffe aircraft.
On 4 October 1943,  was bombed and sunk in the Mediterranean Sea off Cape Ténès, Algeria by Dornier Do 217 aircraft of Kampfgeschwader 100, Luftwaffe.
On 2 December 1943,  was sunk by the explosion of the Liberty ship  during the air raid on Bari.
 On 2 December 1943,  was sunk by the German Luftwaffe during the air raid on Bari.
The fore section sank. The stern section was taken in tow but sank the next day.
On 3 August 1944,  was damaged by a Kriegsmarine radio-controlled explosives boat off Normandy, France. She was subsequently beached at Appledore, Devon, and was scrapped in 1949.
On 15 December 1944,  struck a mine and sank in the North Sea.

Accident
On 16 July 1943,  caught fire at Algiers, Algeria. She was beached and was consequently declared a total loss.
On 4 August 1943,  caught fire and exploded at Algiers.
On 14 April 1944,  was severely damaged by the explosion of Fort Stikine at Bombay, India. She was reduced to a hulk and was scrapped in 1948.
On 14 April 1944,  exploded at Bombay and was obliterated. Twelve other vessels were lost.
On 21 June 1945, Fort La Prairie or Fort La Pairie, 7138 tons, cargo ship, British, ran aground about 0.5 miles SSW of Muckle Skerry light, Muckle Skerry, Out Skerries. Location cited as N60 29 W0 52, she was towed off by Ocean Salvage Ship RFA Salfeda, assisted by local fishermen. She was renamed Elm Hill (1950) and scrapped in 1967.
On 1 February 1946,  collided with Thornaby and sank in the North Sea.
On 23 August 1946,  was wrecked on the Grand Shoal, off Saint Pierre and Miquelon.
On 18 February 1949, LEmerillon (formerly ) ran aground on the Sorelle Rocks off Malta.
On 28 September 1956, Bedford Earl (formerly ) ran aground in the Ryukyu Islands, Japan, in a typhoon.
On 14 June 1953, Bedford Prince (formerly ) ran aground in the Gulf of Paria. She was consequently scrapped.
On 10 February 1954, Catherine M. S. (formerly ) ran aground off Mojima Saki, Japan. She was consequently scrapped.
On 16 October 1954, Travelstar (formerly ) ran aground and caught fire in Buckner Bay. She was declared a total loss.
On 24 March 1955, Yaffo (formerly ) ran aground in Baffy Bay. She was refloated in 1957 and taken in to Monrovia, Liberia. No further service recorded.
On 27 May 1959, Aghios Spyridon (formerly ) ran aground off Havana, Cuba, and caught fire. Although refloated, she was declared a constructive total loss.
On 1 July 1960, Rita (formerly ) ran aground off Goa, India, and broke in two.
On 1 February 1961, Cape Drepanon (formerly ) ran aground in Long Island Sound. She was consequently scrapped.
On 20 December 1963, Corfu Island (formerly ) suffered an engine failure and was consequently wrecked in the Gulf of Saint Lawrence.
On 8 April 1964, Irene X (formerly ) ran aground off Haiphong, China. She was subsequently refloated and scrapped.
On 21 November 1964, Zakia (formerly ) was in collision with the tanker Hyperion off Cape St. Vincent, Portugal. She sank the next day.
On 1 June 1966, Aktor (formerly ) sprang a leak and foundered in the Pacific Ocean.
On 3 November 1966, Progress (formerly ) was wrecked in a typhoon at Madras, India.
On 26 January 1967, Bodoro (formerly ) was in collision with Beaver State  in Chesapeake Bay. She was beached but was consequently declared a constructive total loss.
She was declared a total loss and subsequently scrapped.
On 25 February 1968, African Marquis (formerly ) ran aground on Kasos, Greece, and broke in two.
In 1968, Zhan Dou 76 (formerly ) became stranded. She was subsequently scrapped.
On 18 December 1969, Ibrahim K (formerly ) ran aground at Tocra, Libya and broke up.

Ships in class

See also
Empire ship
Liberty ship
Victory ship
Ocean ship

Further reading
 Syd C. Heal, A Great Fleet of Ships: the Canadian forts & parks, Vanwell Publishing, 1999

References

Ships built in Canada
Ministry of War Transport ships
World War II merchant ships of the United Kingdom